The Brčko bridge massacre was a massacre of approximately 100 civilians of Croat and Bosniak nationalities which took place during the morning of 30 April 1992. The Brčko bridge over the Sava river, from Gunja Croatia, to Brčko was deliberately blown whilst civilians were crossing it. It was blown up by unknown Bosnian Serb soldiers. No one was held responsible for the massacre.

Some sources claim that the perpetrators may have been members of the White Eagles and Arkan's Tigers paramilitaries.

References

Massacres in the Bosnian War
Massacres in 1992
Brčko District
Car and truck bombings in Europe
April 1992 crimes
April 1992 events in Europe
Sava
Massacres of Croats
Massacres of Bosniaks